Manuel Ugarte Ribeiro  (born 11 April 2001) is a Uruguayan professional footballer who plays as a defensive midfielder for Primeira Liga club Sporting CP and the Uruguay national team.

Ugarte came through Fénix's youth academy, being promoted to the first-team in 2016. In December 2021, he joined Portuguese Primeira Liga side Famalicão. Following an impressive half-season, Ugarte signed for fellow Primeira Liga side Sporting CP, winning the Taça da Liga in his first season.

Ugarte is a former youth international for Uruguay, representing his country at various youth levels, being part of the team that finished in third place in the 2020 CONMEBOL Pre-Olympic Tournament. He made his senior international debut in 2021.

Club career

Fénix
Born in Montevideo, Ugarte started his football career in the youth ranks of local club City Park, before joining Fénix's youth setup, being promoted to the first-team at the age of 15 by manager Rosario Martínez. Shortly after, he was included in the 30-man to compete in the 2016 Copa Sudamericana. 

He made his professional debut on 4 December 2016, replacing Agustín Canobbio in the 83rd minute in a 4–1 league win against Danubio. In doing so, he became the youngest ever player in the 21st century to play professionally in Uruguay (aged 15 years and 233 days). Initially Ugarte played as a striker, before being converted to a midfielder.

Under Juan Ramón Carrasco, Ugarte was entrusted to play more regularly, being named club captain at age of 18 and scoring his first goal on 10 March 2019 in a 2–0 win against Racing Club, as he went on to make 14 appearances in the Uruguayan Primera División. On 29 October 2020, Ugarte assisted Luciano Nequecaur goal in the albivioletas 3–1 over Huachipato in the first leg of the 2020 Copa Sudamericana. Overall, he made 57 appearances for the club and scored one goal.

Famalicão
On 29 December 2020, Ugarte signed a five-year contract with Portuguese club Famalicão for a fee of €3 million for 80% of his economic rights. He made his Primeira Liga debut on 17 January 2021, playing the entire 2–0 victory at Santa Clara. On 21 February, he scored his first goal for the club in a 1–0 victory over Rio Ave. Despite initially not being a starter, Ugarte eventually earned a place in the team under manager Ivo Vieira, as his versatility enabled him to play in various positions in midfield, which was found useful by his coach, as Famalicão narrowly missed on European qualification to the Europa Conference League.

Sporting

On 9 August 2021, Ugarte signed a five-year contract with Sporting CP of the same league, for a fee of €6.5 million for half of his economic rights. On 14 August, he made his debut for the club, replacing João Palhinha in the 92nd minute in a 2–1 away win against Braga in the Primeira Liga. Ugarte scored his first goal for Sporting on 2 January 2021, opening the 2–1 home victory over his former club Famalicão. Initially signed as back-up to João Palhinha, following the latter's injury, Ugarte began having a run as starter, with manager Rúben Amorim entrusting him Palhinha's place on 3 December in the 3–1 away victory against rivals Benfica in the Derby de Lisboa. His impressive performances and quick adaptation to the team earned him praise from his manager, as he began to play more regularly and threaten Palhinha's starting position. 

On March 16 2023, he was sent off during extra time of Sporting CP's Europa League match against Arsenal for his challenge on Bukayo Saka.

International career

Youth
Ugarte represented Uruguay at under-20 level, for a total of 5 caps. On 29 December 2019, Uruguay under-23 team head coach Gustavo Ferreyra named Ugarte in 23-man final squad for 2020 CONMEBOL Pre-Olympic Tournament. In this competition, he played seven out of nine matches, scoring in the 1–1 against Brazil in the final stage, as helped Uuruguay to a third-place finish.

Senior
On 5 March 2021, Ugarte was named in Uruguay senior team's 35-man preliminary squad for 2022 FIFA World Cup qualifying matches against Argentina and Bolivia. However, CONMEBOL suspended those matches next day amid concern over the COVID-19 pandemic. He made his senior team debut on 5 September 2021, by coming on as a 70th-minute substitute for Matías Vecino in a 4–2 win against Bolivia.

Career statistics

Club

International

Honours
Sporting CP
Taça da Liga: 2021–22

Individual
 Uruguayan Primera División Team of the Year: 2019

References

External links

2001 births
Living people
Footballers from Montevideo
Association football midfielders
Uruguayan footballers
Uruguay international footballers
Uruguay youth international footballers
Uruguay under-20 international footballers
Uruguayan Primera División players
Primeira Liga players
Club Atlético Fénix players
F.C. Famalicão players
Sporting CP footballers
2022 FIFA World Cup players
Uruguayan expatriate footballers
Uruguayan expatriate sportspeople in Portugal
Expatriate footballers in Portugal